Coordinació Catalana de Colònies, Casals i Clubs d’Esplai (CCCCCE) is a Catholic youth organization in Catalonia. CCCCCE is one of the biggest members of the Catalan youth council (Consell Nacional de la Joventut de Catalunya) and a member of the Catholic umbrella of youth organizations Fimcap.

Structure

CCCCCE is an umbrella organization for the youth work in the Catholic Catalan dioceses.

History 

CCCCCE was founded in 1957. CCCCCE introduced as first organization in Catalonia the concept of "clubs d'esplais" (English: "leisure clubs"). Later this concept became a model for other youth movements in Catalonia.

Member organization

Awards
1990: Creu de Sant Jordi

References

Catholic youth organizations
Youth organisations based in Spain
Fimcap
Catholic Church in Spain